Constantine IV Chliarenus (died May 1157) was Ecumenical Patriarch of Constantinople from November 1154 to 1156.

Bibliography
  access date: 23 July 2015

1157 deaths
12th-century patriarchs of Constantinople
Officials of Manuel I Komnenos